Sarchi is a surname. Notable people with the surname include:
  (born 1971), Italian writer
  (1803 - 1879), French philosopher, financier, essayist
 Philippe Sarchi (1764 - 1830), lawyer, linguist, philologist of Illyrian origin

See also 

 Sarchi (disambiguation)